Matthieu Vaxivière (born 3 December 1994) is a French racing driver from Limoges, France who currently drives for Alpine in the LMP2 class of the FIA World Endurance Championship.

Career

Karting

Vaxivière started his racing career in 2005 in the Karting Championship of France.

Car racing debut
Having made his car racing debut in the MitJet Series in 2010, Vaxivière progressed to the French F4 Championship the subsequent year. A successful campaign followed, as he took the title by winning three races, which included a double victory at Pau.

Formula Renault 2.0

Vaxiviere entered his debut season of the Eurocup Formula Renault 2.0 in 2012 with Tech 1 Racing, which he finished in 29th position with a single point. The Frenchman experienced a more fruitful year in 2013, ending up tenth overall with a pair of victories at Aragón proving to be the highlight of the season.

Formula Renault 3.5

After his two seasons in the Eurocup, Vaxivière graduated to the Formula Renault 3.5 Series for the 2014 season, driving for Lotus alongside Marlon Stöckinger. He finished eighth overall despite missing two rounds due to an injury.

Vaxivière returned to Lotus for the 2015 season. Three wins and a heap of podiums made the French driver vice-champion.

For the first season of the newly rebranded Formula V8 3.5 Series, Vaxivière would partner Matevos Isaakyan at SMP Racing. This season, the Frenchman amassed seven podiums, two of which were wins, and took home fourth place in the standings.

Lotus F1
After completing several post-season tests with both Pons Racing and Lotus in preparation for 2014, the Frenchman was announced by Lotus to drive with them in the Formula Renault 3.5 Series alongside Filipino-Swiss rookie Marlon Stöckinger.

Sportscar debut 
Having competed in various endurance events such as the GT3 Le Mans Cup throughout his time in junior formulae, Vaxivière made his full-time transition into sportscar racing near the end of 2016, when he partnered Michele Rugolo and Stéphane Lémeret in the GT category of the Asian Le Mans Series from round two onwards. He helped DH Racing to finish second in the championship, having taken victory at the Fuji Speedway.

Vaxivière's main campaign in 2017 would lie in the LMP2 class of the FIA World Endurance Championship, which he contested with TDS Racing. Having taken a podium on debut at Silverstone, the Frenchman finished 16th in the drivers' standings.

2018 would start out positively for Vaxivière, who finished second in the first two races of the European Le Mans Series with TDS before embarking on a season in the WEC with the French team. A podium during the 2019 24 Hours of Le Mans would prove to be the highlight of his season, which Vaxivière finished eighth overall.

As a result of the COVID-19 pandemic, 2020 saw Vaxivière compete in a myriad of championships, including the GT World Challenge Europe Endurance Cup or the Mitjet International series, where the Frenchman took four wins from as many appearances. That year also yielded another podium at Le Mans, Vaxivière driving for Panis Racing alongside Nico Jamin and Julien Canal.

Alpine works driver

2021: Hypercar debut 
For the 2021 season, Vaxivière teamed up with Nicolas Lapierre and André Negrão to drive an Alpine A480 in the Hypercar category of the FIA World Endurance Championship. The campaign began on a promising note, as the team finished second at Spa-Francorchamps before Vaxivière followed that up by taking a pole position in the Algarve. The outfit stabilised their pace after another second place in Monza, with them taking third for the remaining rounds, Vaxivière and his teammates being unable to match the pace of the Toyota Gazoo Racing squad.

2022: WEC title challenge 
Nevertheless, Vaxivière, Lapierre and Negrão returned to Alpine in 2022. At the season opener in Sebring, the Frenchman put on a particularly impressive showing, setting the fastest lap and helping his team to their first victory in the Hypercar category. Vaxivière and his partners took second at Spa before finishing a disappointing fourth in the 24 Hours of Le Mans, as issues with the car's clutch control and ignition coil systems respectively put the team out of contention for the podium. They bounced back emphatically in Monza, where, having made contact in a hard-fought battle with the Toyota of Kamui Kobayashi, Vaxivière scored another win. However, this would end up being the team's final finish ahead of their rivals Toyota, with a power reduction for the final two races thanks to the BoP mechanism leading to Alpine finishing second in the overall standings.

2023: Return to LMP2 
Vaxivière and Alpine stepped down to the LMP2 category for the 2023 season, where the French driver partnered Charles Milesi and Julien Canal.

In addition, he also paired up with François Perrodo and Ben Barnicoat to race in the Pro-Am Cup of the European Le Mans Series that same year.

Racing record

Racing career summary 

† As Vaxivière was a guest driver, he was ineligible to score points.

Complete French F4 Championship results 
(key) (Races in bold indicate pole position) (Races in italics indicate fastest lap)

Complete Eurocup Formula Renault 2.0 results 
(key) (Races in bold indicate pole position) (Races in italics indicate fastest lap)

Complete Formula V8 3.5 Series results 
(key) (Races in bold indicate pole position) (Races in italics indicate fastest lap)

Complete FIA World Endurance Championship results

* Season still in progress.

Complete 24 Hours of Le Mans results

Complete GP3 Series results
(key) (Races in bold indicate pole position) (Races in italics indicate fastest lap)

Complete European Le Mans Series results

Complete IMSA SportsCar Championship results
(key) (Races in bold indicate pole position; races in italics indicate fastest lap)

† Points only counted towards the Michelin Endurance Cup, and not the overall LMP2 Championship.

References

External links
Driver Database

1994 births
Living people
French racing drivers
Sportspeople from Limoges
French F4 Championship drivers
Formula Renault 2.0 Alps drivers
Formula Renault Eurocup drivers
World Series Formula V8 3.5 drivers
FIA World Endurance Championship drivers
24 Hours of Spa drivers
24 Hours of Le Mans drivers
24 Hours of Daytona drivers
French GP3 Series drivers
WeatherTech SportsCar Championship drivers
Auto Sport Academy drivers
Charouz Racing System drivers
AF Corse drivers
SMP Racing drivers
TDS Racing drivers
Signature Team drivers
DAMS drivers
Racing Engineering drivers
Wayne Taylor Racing drivers
Starworks Motorsport drivers
Tech 1 Racing drivers
R-Motorsport drivers
Audi Sport drivers
W Racing Team drivers
KCMG drivers
R-ace GP drivers
Nürburgring 24 Hours drivers
24H Series drivers
Le Mans Cup drivers